The 1999–2000 BBL season, was known as the Dairylea Dunkers Championship for sponsorship reasons, the regular season commenced on September 15, 1999, and ended on April 8, 2000, with a total of 13 teams competing. For the first time in the league’s history, the 13 teams were split into two geographically divided Conferences, seven in the North and six in the South, with northern teams playing 36 games and southern teams playing 34 games each. The season was dominated by the success of Manchester Giants, conquering the Northern Conference and Championship Play-offs, whilst London Towers were victorious in the Southern Conference and the uni-ball Trophy. Sheffield Sharks were also successful in defending their Sainsbury's Classic Cola National Cup.

London Towers featured in European competition, participating in the Saporta Cup, though with a 3-7 record they finished at the bottom of Group G and thus failed to progress beyond the Group stage. Cross-town rivals Greater London Leopards also made a brief appearance in the Korać Cup but following a 155-189 aggregate defeat to ÍRB Reykjanesbær in the Preliminary round, their first foray into Europe was merely a cameo.

The Southern All-Stars beat their Northern rivals in the eleventh annual All-Star Game with a 177-180 victory, the closest result in the League's history. That was the 7th overall win of the South against the North who won 5 games since the All-Star Game's inception in 1989.

Dairylea Dunkers Championship (Tier 1)

Final standings

Northern Conference

Southern Conference

The play-offs

Quarter-finals

Semi-finals

Final 
{{basketballbox|bg=#eee
 | date = May 6, 2000
 | time =
 | report = Report
 | teamA = Manchester Giants
 | scoreA = 74
 | scoreB = 65
 | Q1 = 18-22
 | Q2 = 21-15
 | Q3 = 15-17
 | Q4 = 20-11
 | OT = 
 | teamB = Birmingham Bullets
 | points1 = Tony Dorsey (MVP) 22, Travis Conlan 19
 | rebounds1 =
 | assist1 =
 | otherstat1 = 
 | points2 = Emiko Etete 13, Fabulous Flournoy 12,
 | rebounds2 =
 | assist2 =
 | otherstat2 =
 | place = Wembley Arena, London
 | attendance =6,000 Giants coach Nick Nurse  Bullets coach Mike Finger
 | referee =
 | TV =
}}

 National League Division 1 (Tier 2) 

 Final standings 

PlayoffsQuarter-finalsSemi-finalsFinal National League Division 2 (Tier 3) 

 Final standings 

Play Off Final - Kingston 68 Manchester 62

 National League Division 3 (Tier 4) 

 Final standings 

Play Off Final - Mansfield v Doncaster 84-76, 75-75

 Sainsbury's Classic Cola National Cup 

 Last 16 

 Quarter-finals 

 Semi-finals 

 Final 

 uni-ball Trophy 

 Group stage 
Group A
 Derby qualified ahead of Birmingham on head-to-head results.
Group B
Group C
Group D
 Chester qualified ahead of Brighton on head-to-head results.

 Quarter-finals 

 Semi-finals 

 Final 

 All-Star Game 

 Statistics leaders 

 Seasonal awards 

 Most Valuable Player: Tony Dorsey (Manchester Giants)
 Domestic Player of the Year: Steve Bucknall (London Towers)
 Import Player of the Year: Tony Dorsey (Manchester Giants)
 Defensive Player of the Year: Roy Hairston (Manchester Giants)
 Most Improved Player of the Year: Ian Whyte (Newcastle Eagles)
 Coach of the Year: Nick Nurse (Manchester Giants)
 All-Star First Team: Tony Dorsey (Manchester Giants)
 Danny Lewis (London Towers)
 Terrell Myers (Sheffield Sharks)
 Steve Bucknall (London Towers)
 Roy Hairston (Manchester Giants)
 All-Star Second Team:'''
 James Hamilton (Chester Jets)
 Nigel Lloyd (Milton Keynes Lions)
 Nate Reinking (Sheffield Sharks)
 John McCord (Edinburgh Rocks)
 Brandon Brantley (Greater London Leopards)

References 

British Basketball League seasons
1
British